New Jerusalem (Nova Jerusalém) is a city theater founded in 1968, located in city of Brejo da Madre de Deus, in the district of Fazenda Nova, about 180 km from Recife, the capital of Pernambuco - Brazil.
Every Easter, the theatre hosts an outdoor Passion of Christ performance which tells the history of the Death and Resurrection of Jesus. It's considered the largest open-air theater in the world due to its 100000 m2 (1.1Million ft2), surrounded by 3500 meters of walls and 70 towers.

Show

Every night at 6 pm, in just two hours, the crowd follows the footsteps of Jesus and his followers during nine permanent stages build it specially for the encenation, under the starry skies of the rural Pernambuco. The big mankind story of faith, hope and excitement for the Christians, containing 60 renowned actors (many from Rede Globo) and more than 500 back actors (which could be the visitors as well), with a daily average audience of 8000 people.

Another strength of the scenario is the technical infrastructure with digital sound, pyrotechnics, lights, special effects and elaborate customers; inside in a Jerusalem city atmosphere of 1.1M ft2 surrounded by walls and towers which delights national and international visitors.

Stages and Scenes

1 - Sermon (Prologue, Temptation in the desert and sermon on the mount scenes
2 - Jerusalem Temple (Discurssions in the temple and The supreme council)
3 - The Upper Room (The last supper/dinner)
4 - The Garden (Agony in the garden, Judas betrayal and Arrest of Jesus)
5 - Herod Palace (Herod bacchanal/orgy and Jesus against Herod)
6 - Roman Forum (Pilate against Jesus, Scourging and Condemnation of Jesus)
7 - Via Sacra (Meeting with Mary, Women of lamentations and The Cirino)
8 - Calvary (Despair of Judas, Crucifixion and death on the cross, the descent of the cross and Mater painful)
9 - Sepulcher (The burial, Resurrection, Three Marias (Mary's), Angel of resurrection and Ascension of Jesus)

Numbers

 Record audience in 2008 72000 people, from 23 Brazilian states and 11 Countries;
 60 actors;
 over 500 back actors;
 over 400 professionals of sound, lights, special effects, security, administration, etc.;
 Theater city area of 100000 m2 (1.1 Million ft2), surrounded by 3500 meters of wall and 70 towers;
 9 stages, with a total number of 26 scenes;
 Capacity of 8000 people times nine days;
 860 lights reflectors spending 1.29 Mwatts;
 72 digital sound tables with a total of 150000 watts of power;
 800 costumes in the wardrobe.

History

It was in 1951 when the marketer Epaminondas Mendonça had the idea to realize during the holy week the scenes of life, death and resurrection of Jesus, in the streets of the small parish of Fazenda Nova. The idea surges after his readings in a magazine about a German city (Oberammergau) who was doing something similar called Passion Play.

In 1956, Plínio Pacheco arrives in Brejo da Madre de Deus and soon married Diva Pacheco, daughter of Epaminondas and local actress. In 1958, Plinio become director of the theater and in 1962 he had the idea to build the New Jerusalem Theater as a small replica of the Jerusalem city. The city theatre just was finished in 1968, and since then Plinio Pacheco was the Director until his death in 2002.

References

See also

Photoslide (https://www.flickr.com/photos/48292424@N05/sets/72157623709326522/show/)

Theatres in Pernambuco
Buildings and structures in Pernambuco
Tourist attractions in Pernambuco